The discography of Fun Factory, a German dance group, consists of 3 studio albums, one extended play, one compilation album, one remix album, 17 singles, including two as a featured artist, 4 promotional singles, and 14 music videos, including two as a featured artist. The first releases were the debut studio album Nonstop in 1994, preceded by the chart hits "Groove Me" and "Close to You", both released in 1993 and reprised on the 1995 album titled Close to You. "Take Your Chance" and "Pain" followed in 1994. This success was followed with the sophomore release Fun-Tastic in 1995, preceded by single releases "I Wanna B with U", "Celebration" and "Doh Wah Diddy", a cover version of Manfred Mann's song "Do Wah Diddy". Two more singles, "Don't Go Away" and "I Love You", have been released in 1996, both of moderate success, respectively. In 2015, Fun Factory returned with the single "Let's Get Crunk", the lead single of their third studio album "Back To The Factory".

Albums

Studio albums

Extended plays

Compilation albums

Remix albums

Singles

Promotional singles

Featured singles

Music videos

Featured music videos

References

Discographies of German artists
Electronic music discographies